This is a list of the 20 members of the European Parliament for Sweden in the 2014 to 2019 session.

List

Midterm replacements 
Isabella Lövin resigned on 3 October 2014 when she was appointed Minister for International Development Cooperation in the Swedish Government. She was replaced by Linnéa Engström.
Marit Paulsen resigned on 29 September 2015 due health problems. She was replaced by Jasenko Selimovic.
Peter Eriksson resigned on 25 May 2016 when he was appointed Minister for Housing and Digitalization in the Swedish Government. He was replaced by Jakop Dalunde.
Jens Nilsson died on 13 March 2018. He was replaced by Aleksander Gabelic.
Lars Adaktusson resigned on 23 September 2018 when he was elected Member of the Riksdag in the 2018 general election. He was replaced by Anders Sellström.

References

Sweden
List
2014